Hershell West is an American former basketball player and coach. He played basketball at Eula D. Britton in his hometown of Rayville, Louisiana and won the Louisiana State AA Championship in 1959. Grambling State Tigers men's basketball head coach Fred Hobdy offered West and the four other Britton starters athletic scholarships to Grambling State after watching them play. West played college basketball for the Tigers for four years, where he won a National Association of Intercollegiate Athletics (NAIA) championship in 1961 and was a two-time first-team All-Southwestern Athletic Conference (SWAC) selection in 1962 and 1963. In 1962, he and six other Tigers players participated in a goodwill tour of Latin America.

West was selected in the 1963 NBA draft as the 15th overall pick by the Syracuse Nationals but he never played in the National Basketball Association (NBA). He became a basketball coach for Richwood High School in Louisiana, where he served as a mentor to future NBA player Larry Wright. West helped Wright transfer to the larger Western High School in Washington, D.C., where he became a highly recruited prospect. Wright honored West by turning down other collegiate offers to attend Grambling State and play for the Tigers.

West was an inaugural member of the Grambling Legends Sports Hall of Fame in 2009.

References

Year of birth missing (living people)
Living people
African-American basketball coaches
African-American basketball players
American men's basketball players
Basketball coaches from Louisiana
Basketball players from Louisiana
Grambling State Tigers men's basketball players
Guards (basketball)
High school basketball coaches in the United States
People from Rayville, Louisiana
Syracuse Nationals draft picks
21st-century African-American people